The Thomas R. Kline School of Law of Duquesne University is a private Catholic university law school located in Pittsburgh, Pennsylvania. It is approved by the American Bar Association and is a member of the Association of American Law Schools. Dean April M. Barton joined the school in 2019 as its 13th dean.

The School of Law was founded in 1911, and is the only multiple-division law school in western Pennsylvania. Located on the  Duquesne University campus, the law school is walking distance to Pittsburgh's downtown legal, corporate, and government communities. The School of Law currently boasts over 5,800 alumni practicing in every field of law, in all 50 states and several foreign countries. Additionally, as of 2017, Duquesne's Legal Writing program is ranked 14th in the United States.

According to Duquesne's 2018 ABA-required disclosures, admission acceptance rate is 58% while 71.6% of the Class of 2018 obtained full-time, long-term, JD-required employment ten months after graduation, excluding solo practitioners.

In its 2023 U.S. News & World Report law school ranking, Duquesne University School of Law ranked 129th. The part-time evening J.D. program is ranked No. 41 in the nation.

History
In 1911, the Law School became the first professional school added to Duquesne University. The Law School was first located on 4th Ave in downtown Pittsburgh at the George Building, and is now located on the main university campus less than a mile from the Allegheny County Courthouse and the center of the Pittsburgh legal community. Classes began on September 25, 1911, and consisted of 12 students. The Law School was founded as an evening program, designed to allow individuals with family and work obligations the opportunity to study law. Over the years, Duquesne Law School expanded its programs to include a full-time day and part-time program. However, after almost 100 years, the evening program still remains as the only program of its kind in Western Pennsylvania. Graduates from Duquesne University School of Law comprise over a third of the Allegheny County Bar Association (Pittsburgh). The traditions and goals of the Law School are characterized by the school's motto, salus populi suprema lex, "The Welfare of the People is the Highest Law."

On September 7, 2022, it was announced that the law school has been renamed after litigator and former alumnus Thomas R. Kline, following a $50 million donation. The donation is the largest in the history of the university.

Academics
The school offers several degree programs. The Juris Doctor, the primary degree required to practice law in the United States, can be obtained through either the daytime, evening, or part-time division. An LLM, or Master of Laws, is offered through the School of Law for foreign attorneys who have already received a law degree in their native country but wish to become acquainted with the United States legal system.

In addition, Duquesne offers several joint degree programs through other graduate divisions within the university, and other institutions in the Pittsburgh area. Joint degrees currently offered in conjunction with a J.D. include, Master of Business Administration, Master of Science in Taxation, Master of Science in Environmental Science & Management, and Master of Divinity (with Pittsburgh Theological Seminary).

In 2017, U.S. News & World Report ranked the legal writing program at Duquesne Law 14th in the nation.

Alumni
There are over 8,000 alumni of the school practicing in all 50 states and several foreign countries. Almost 30 percent of the practicing lawyers in western Pennsylvania are graduates of the law school. A large number of graduates (160) from Duquesne Law are judges on the local, state, and federal levels, including the highest courts and appellate courts in over 20 states. Of all the law schools in Pennsylvania, Duquesne has produced the most judges seated in the Superior Court, Commonwealth Court, and Court of Common Pleas.

Clinics and programs
The Hugo L. Black Law Clinic of Duquesne University School of Law offers several clinical programs which allow students to learn practical lawyering skills while still in law school. Duquesne currently operates five clinical programs, a criminal defense externship program, as well as an e-discovery simulation course.

Bill of Rights Clinic - Students are trained in case intake and interviewing, client counseling, fact investigation, case analysis, negotiation, research, drafting of memos and other pleadings and documents.
Civil and Family Justice Law Clinic - Students represent indigent individuals in matters involving visitation, custody, and paternity, as well as general civil matters, including landlord/tenant disputes.
Community Enterprise Clinic - Students provide a broad range of transactional services, including preparation of incorporation documents and bylaws; registration with the Bureau of Charitable Organizations, trade mark application, and applications for recognition under Internal Revenue Code Section 501c.
Unemployment Compensation Clinic - Students working with the unemployment compensation clinic receive substantive seminars related to unemployment compensation law including case law, and procedure for willful misconduct and voluntary quit cases, overpayment issues and offsets.
Urban Development Clinic - Services provided by students include general real estate matters, title searches, negotiation and drafting of development agreements, preparation of land use cases, appellate land use practice, and attending and participating in public meetings and hearings.
Criminal Defense Externship Program - Students assist the Allegheny County Office of Conflicts Counsel with client interviews, jail visits, case planning, preparation of pleadings and representation of clients at preliminary hearings.
E-Discovery Simulation Course - The class uses the case study approach and simulation techniques, allowing students to gain “hands on” experience in developing a litigation strategy based on simulated facts and data.

International programs

China Program - This program provides law students from all over the world the unique opportunity to discover and learn about the legal system in the country of China. Students who are enrolled in this program will travel to the city of Beijing, China to take legal course-work that will enhance their understanding of Chinese law.
Ireland Program -  A three-week summer study of law  program in conjunction with the University College Dublin Faculty of Law and the Queen's University Belfast Faculty of Law. This program covers subjects related to the law of the European Union from an Irish perspective and offers students 4.5 (semester) hours of ABA-approved credit.
European Summer Study of Law Program - A three-week program of one-week modules each in European Private Law, European Public Law, and a Workshop in Corporate Governance, totaling 4 1/2 (semester) credit hours of ABA-approved credit.  In Cologne, classes will meet at the Institute for American Law located on the campus of the University of Cologne.  The program also includes a three-day trip to Paris in addition to a three-day trip to Brussels.  In Paris, students attend lectures at the Sorbonne.  In Brussels, excursions to the European Council, European Commission, and the American Embassy are incorporated into the program.

Facilities

The Law School is housed Edward J. Hanley Hall and the Dr. John E. Murray, Jr. Pavilion on the Duquesne University campus. Administrative and faculty offices, classrooms of various sizes, two courtrooms, study areas and a multilevel law library are all under one roof, along with a locker room, café, lounge area and offices for student organizations. Offices and conference areas for the School’s in-house clinics are located in nearby Fisher Hall. Law School facilities feature computer and audio/video technology for teaching, research and administrative functions. Law School students can use all of the other amenities on Duquesne's  campus, including computer laboratories, the University’s Gumberg Library, dining services and recreational facilities.

In 1999, Duquesne University entered into a historical agreement with Allegheny County for the Duquesne Center for Legal Information to manage the 131-year old Allegheny County Law Library (ACLL), one of the largest and oldest county law libraries in the country. As a result, Duquesne law students have direct access to the historical and rich collection and reading room facility of the ACLL. As a result, students can utilize both the Duquesne Law Library facilities and the Allegheny County Law Library for research and study.

Publications
Duquesne Law Review - The primary publication of Duquesne University School of Law, the Law Review is a student-edited legal journal. The journal is published quarterly, and receives submissions from top legal scholars throughout the United States.
Duquesne Business Law Journal - Produced annually by a student editorial board, the Business Law Journal contains articles that focus on the specific areas of corporate, tax, consumer, labor, bankruptcy and business law. Law students and alumni are encouraged to submit articles for publication.
Duquesne Criminal Law Journal - The Criminal Law Journal is a student-run organization that publishes scholarly works semi-annually in an online format. Its goal is to bring a venue to analyze all issues in the field of criminal law. The Journal utilizes a unique system of peer review, in which members from the legal community review submissions to the Journal, thus maintaining a higher academic standard.
Juris Magazine - This student-edited law school magazine is an ABA award-winning publication containing articles of current interest to the entire legal community. Since 1967, Juris has published articles concerning substantive areas of the law as well as matters of local and national interest.

Employment 
According to Duquesne's official 2018 ABA-required disclosures, 90.8% of the Class of 2018 was overall employed nine months after graduation, excluding solo practitioners. See other employment statistics here.

 The bar preparation is ranked No. 9 in the country by National Jurist, the country's leading legal education publication.
 The 2019 first-time bar passage rate was 87.88%.
 preLaw Magazine awarded Duquesne University School of Law an A rating for 2018 Employment.
 preLaw Magazine awarded Duquesne University School of Law an A− rating for Criminal Law in 2018.

Costs
The total cost of attendance (indicating the cost of tuition, fees, and living expenses) at Duquesne for the 2013-2014 academic year is $51,846. The Law School Transparency estimated debt-financed cost of attendance for three years is $198,358.

The tuition for a master of laws for foreign law students is $23,350.

In September 2014, National Jurist recognized Duquesne University School of Law as a “Best Value” law school, making it one out of seven private schools that hold this title on the national list.

References

External links

Catholic law schools in the United States
School Law
Educational institutions established in 1911
Law schools in Pennsylvania
Universities and colleges in Pittsburgh
1911 establishments in Pennsylvania